Tadeusz Ulatowski (1915–2012) was a Polish basketball player and coach.

Later he became a involved in running various sports organisations including the Polish Olympic Committee and became an academic sports scientist and researcher.

References 

Polish basketball coaches
1915 births
Sportspeople from Łódź
2012 deaths